Scoparia falsa is a species of moth in the family Crambidae. It is endemic to New Zealand.

Taxonomy

It was described by Alfred Philpott in 1924. However the placement of this species within the genus Scoparia is in doubt. As a result, this species has also been referred to as Scoparia (s.l.) falsa.

Description

The wingspan is 21–24 mm. The forewings are pale brown, irrorated with white and with scattered blackish-brown scales. There is a short blackish-brown line from the middle of the base. The first line is white, margined with brown on the costa. The second line is white, anteriorly margined by a series of blackish dots. The hindwings are ochreous-grey, tinged with fuscous in females. Adults have been recorded on wing in February.

References

Moths described in 1924
Moths of New Zealand
Scorparia
Endemic fauna of New Zealand
Endemic moths of New Zealand